The 2007 World's Strongest Man was the 30th edition of World's Strongest Man and was won by Mariusz Pudzianowski from Poland. It was his fourth and record tying title. Sebastian Wenta from Poland finished second, and Terry Hollands from the United Kingdom finished third after finishing seventh the previous year. 2006 champion Phil Pfister from the United States finished fourth. The contest was held in Anaheim, California.

Qualifying heats

Heat 1

Heat 2

Heat 3

Heat 4

Heat 5

Final results

References

External links
 Official site

2007 in sports
World's Strongest Man